The State Border Service (SBS) (DSG) also commonly known by its paramilitary force as the Turkmen Border Troops is a border guard agency of the Armed Forces of Turkmenistan. It is currently a public service department of the government of the country and is under the command of the Ministry for National Security of Turkmenistan.

History
The service was established on 11 August 1992, by order of President Saparmyrat Nyýazow, on the basis of the Soviet Border Troops in the Turkestan Military District. Until 1997, the Armed Forces of Turkmenistan included the Border Troops of the Ministry of Defense, which were then transformed into the State Border Service. It cooperated with Russian border guards who remained in country until 1999 as a result of a joint Russian–Turkmen agreement on the protection of the state border of Turkmenistan, which was signed in 1993. It slowly evolved to meet the standards of its counterparts, with the DSG being allowed to inspect goods and other items transported across the border of Turkmenistan in April 1998. At the end of 2001, 3 new border detachments were created, with 2 (in Kushka and Köýtendag), being intensified the cover of the Afghan border to prevent Taliban fighters from taking refuge in the country during the War in Afghanistan. Recently, the service created a separate naval border patrol division stationed in Türkmenbaşy. In 2014, there were several incidents for the service along the Afghanistan–Turkmenistan border, including one in February when Turkmen border guards killed a militant who crossed the border illegally and in retaliation three Turkmen border guards were killed later that month. Later that May, three Turkmen guards were killed by an armed group crossing the border from Ghormach District, Afghanistan.

Responsibilities
The main tasks of the service include the following:

 Protecting of the national border of the country 
 Combating international terrorism and drug trafficking
 Targeting illegal migration and human trafficking 
 Protecting oil and gas platforms and pipelines in the Turkmen sector of the Caspian Sea.

The head of the service is a member of the Council of Border Guard Commanders of the Commonwealth of Independent States (CIS).

Structure 

 Central Office
 Border Troops
 Headquarters of the Border Troops of Turkmenistan
 Atamurat Border Detachment 
 Border Outpost "Syakhralyk"
 Ashgabat Border Detachment
 Border Outpost "Archabil"
 Border Outpost "Asuda"
 Border Outpost "Bagir"
 Border Outpost "Bitaraplyk"
 Border Outpost "Vatan"
 Border Outpost "Gindivar"
 Balkanabat Training Border Detachment 
 Bakharly Border Detachment 
 Garabogaz Border Detachment 
 Dashoguz Border Detachment 
 Kaakhki Border Detachment 
 Border Outpost "Aksuv"
 Border Outpost "Yashlyk"
 Makhtumkuli Border Detachment 
 Serakhs Border Detachment 
 Border Outpost "Incirli"
 Serhetabat Border Detachment 
 Border Outpost "Medesan"
 Takhtabazar Border Detachment 
 Border Outpost "Watanchi"
 Border Outpost "Garavulkhana"
 Border Outpost "Murghab"
 Border Outpost "Pendy"
 Turkmenabat Border Detachment 
 Esenguly Border Detachment 
 Etrek Border Detachment 
 Caspian Sea Border Detachment
 Separate Maritime Border Guard Detachment (Türkmenbaşy)
 17th Separate Border Aviation Regiment (Mary)
 Music Group "Border Sounds" 
Turkmen Alabai Center 
 Turkmen State Border Service Institute

Breastplate "Valiant Border Guard" 
The Breastplate "Valiant Border Guard" is the state medal designed to honour members of the DSG. It consists of medals in both the first and second degrees. It has the shape of a regular green octagon, which is one of the main elements of the State Emblem of Turkmenistan, inscribed in an circle with a diameter of 40 mm. It was created on 20 December 2005.

Leadership
 Colonel General Akmurad Kabulov (1992 – 1999)
 Major General Tirkish Tyrmyev
 Major General Agageldi Mammetgeldiyev (2002 – 2003)
 Major General Annageldy Gummanov (2003)
 Major General Annaur Atzhanov (2003 – 2004)
 Lieutenant General Orazberdy Soltanov (2014 – 2006)
 Major General Bayram Alovov (2006 – 2009)
 Lieutenant General Myrat Islamov (2009 – 2012)
 Major General Aman Garayev (2012 – 2013)
 Lieutenant General Myrat Islamov (2013 – 2016)
 Major General Begenç Gündogdyýew (2016 – 2018)
 Colonel Shadurdy Durdyyev (2018 – 2021)
 Colonel Ýazgeldi Bäşimowiç Nuryýew (2021–present)

See also
 Armed Forces of Turkmenistan
 Ministry of Defense (Turkmenistan)
 Chief of the General Staff (Turkmenistan)
 Turkmen National Guard
 Turkmen Ground Forces
 Turkmen Air Force 
 Turkmen Navy

References

Turkmenistan
Troops
Law enforcement in Turkmenistan
Government paramilitary forces
Military of Turkmenistan
1992 establishments in Turkmenistan